The name Kornbluth or Kornblut ("grain blossom") may refer to:

People 
 Anne Kornblut (born 1973), American journalist
 Cyril M. Kornbluth (1923–1958), American science fiction author
 Frances Kornbluth, American abstract expressionist painter
 Jacob Kornbluth, director
 Josh Kornbluth (born 1959), American comedic monologuist
 Sally Kornbluth, cell biologist and Professor of Pharmacology

Other 
 Pohl & Kornbluth, the writing team of Frederik Pohl and Cyril M. Kornbluth
 Dr. Walter Kornbluth, fictional character in the 1984 movie Splash (film)

See also
Kornblit